Santiago Iñiguez de Onzoño (born May 17, 1962, Madrid, Spain) is the Executive President of IE University in Madrid, Spain. He studied at Complutense University of Madrid and Oxford University, UK. Iñiguez de Onzoño is a Doctor of Law and holds an MBA from IE Business School.  He was a Recognized Student at Oxford University, UK.

Iñiguez has worked as a management consultant and has played an active role in the field of quality control and development of management education in Europe. He is the past Chair of AACSB and serves on the boards of Renmin University Business School (China), Antai Business School (Jiao Tong University, China), Renmin University Business School (China), Mazars University (France), LUISS Business School (Italy), and FGV-EASP Fundaçao Getulio Vargas (Brazil).

He was portrayed by the Financial Times as “one of the most significant figures in promoting European business schools internationally” . Iñiguez is also President of the IE Fund in the US. 

Iñiguez was the first recipient (2019) of the Founders Award by Thinkers 50, the prestigious global ranking of thoughtful leaders in Management. He was the first European appointed as “Dean of the Year” by Poets & Quants (2017). He has also been member on the board of AMBA (Association of MBA), founding member of EQUIS (European Quality Improvement System) and the founder of the Reinventing Higher Education conference. 

He is also one of the founders and member of the board of Headspring, a joint venture of IE Business School and the Financial Times. 

He is the author of “The Learning Curve: How Business Schools Are Reinventing Education” (2011), “Cosmopolitan Managers: Executive Education That Works” (2016), “Business Despite Borders: Companies in the Age of Populist Anti-Globalization” (2018), "In An Ideal Business: How The Ideas of 10 female Philosophers Bring Value Into The Workplace" (2019) and "Philosophy Inc.: Applying Wisdom to everyday management" (2023), all published by Springer Palgrave Macmillan

Iñiguez is a regular speaker at international conferences. He is one of the 500 Global LinkedIn Influencers, and frequently contributes in different journals and media on higher education and executive developments

Iniguez is Professor of Strategic Management at IE Business School and a regular contributor on LinkedIn.

Recent articles written 
 El País, Tribuna - Santiago Iñiguez de Onzoño - Cualquier tiempo pasado fue peor, 18/05/2009
 La Cuestión Universitaria: La educación superior en un entorno global: estrategias de internacionalización de las universidades
 En El País - "El frac verde de Beethoven y la innovación europea", 26-01-2009
 Santiago Iniguez on FT's: Ask the expert: Online Q&A - European business schools, December 3, 2008
 Expansión "El peor de los tiempos, el mejor de los tiempos", 22/11/2008
 Humboldtian Faculty and Mavens - Santiago Iniguez, 11 November 2008
 Discussing Social Responsibility in Shanghai, 11 November 2008

References

External links 
SantiagoIniguez.com
TheLearningCurveBook.com
IE Business School
IE University website
IE Higher Education Group website
IE Business School website
IE Media Campus

Complutense University of Madrid alumni
Living people
Academic staff of IE University
1962 births

es:IE University